The 2018 Toronto FC season was the 12th season in the history of Toronto FC. Toronto FC reached the Champions League finals for the first time in their history. After a 2–1 home loss to Guadalajara on April 17 in the first leg of the CONCACAF Champions League final, TFC would win the return away leg 2–1 on April 25, leading to a draw on aggregate, but lost 4–2 in the penalty shootout. Later in the season, on September 19, Toronto FC played against Tigres UANL in the inaugural Campeones Cup, losing the match 3–1 at home. Reigning MLS Cup champions Toronto FC failed to qualify for the playoffs after a 2–1 home loss against the Vancouver Whitecaps on October 6, 2018, with three games left to play in the season.

Squad
As of May 9, 2018.

International roster slots 
Toronto has seven MLS International Roster Slots for use in the 2018 season. They traded one spot to Los Angeles FC in exchange of $50,000 of General Allocation Money.

Transfers

In

Loan In

Draft picks 
Draft picks are not automatically signed to the team roster. Only those who are signed to a contract will be listed as transfers in.

Out

Loan Out

Competitions

Preseason

Major League Soccer

League tables

Eastern Conference

Overall

Results summary

Results by round

Matches

Canadian Championship

Semi-finals

Final

CONCACAF Champions League

Round of 16

Quarter-finals

Semi-finals

Finals

Campeones Cup

Competitions summary

Goals and assists 

Source: Toronto FC

Source: Toronto FC

Shutouts 

Source: Toronto FC

Disciplinary record 
{| class="wikitable sortable alternance"  style="font-size:85%; text-align:center; line-height:14px; width:85%;"
|-
!rowspan="2" width=10|No.
!rowspan="2" width=10|Pos.
!rowspan="2" width=10|Nat.
!rowspan="2" scope=col style="width:275px;"|Player
!colspan="2" width=80|Major League Soccer
!colspan="2" width=80|Canadian Championship
!colspan="2" width=80|Champions League
!colspan="2" width=80|Campeones Cup
!colspan="2" width=80|TOTAL
|-
! !!  !!  !!  !!  !!  !!  !!  !!  !! 
|-
|3||DF|||| Drew Moor    ||0||0||0||0||1||0||0||0||1||0
|-
|4||MF|||| Michael Bradley    ||2||0||0||0||1||0||0||0||3||0
|-
|5||DF|||| Ashtone Morgan    ||2||0||0||0||0||0||0||0||2||0
|-
|10||FW|||| Sebastian Giovinco    ||3||1||0||0||2||0||0||0||5||1
|-
|12||DF|||| Jason Hernandez    ||1||0||0||0||0||0||0||0||1||0
|-
|17||FW|||| Jozy Altidore    ||1||1||0||0||1||0||0||0||2||0
|-
|21||MF|||| Jonathan Osorio    ||1||0||0||0||1||0||0||0||2||0
|-
|22||FW|||| Jordan Hamilton    ||1||0||0||0||0||0||0||0||1||0
|-
|46||DF|||| Mitchell Taintor    ||1||0||0||0||0||0||0||0||1||0
|-
|96||DF|||| Auro Jr.    ||0||0||0||0||1||0||0||0||1||0
|-
|- class="sortbottom"
| colspan="4"|Totals||12||1||0||0||7||0||0||0||19||1

Honours

MLS Team of the Week

CONCACAF Champions League Golden Ball

CONCACAF Champions League Golden Boot

George Gross Memorial Trophy

References

External links 
2018 Toronto FC season at Official Site

Toronto FC seasons
Toronto FC
Tor
Toronto FC
Toronto